In mathematics, a function f defined on some set X with real or complex values is called bounded if the set of its values is bounded. In other words, there exists a real number M such that 

for all x in X. A function that is not bounded is said to be unbounded.

If f is real-valued and f(x) ≤ A for all x in X, then the function is said to be bounded (from) above by A. If f(x) ≥ B for all x in X, then the function is said to be bounded (from) below by B. A real-valued function is bounded if and only if it is bounded from above and below.

An important special case is a bounded sequence, where X is taken to be the set N of natural numbers. Thus a sequence f = (a0, a1,  a2, ...) is bounded if there exists a real number M such that

for every natural number n. The set of all bounded sequences forms the sequence space .

The definition of boundedness can be generalized to functions f : X → Y taking values in a more general space Y by requiring that the image f(X) is a bounded set in Y.

Related notions 
Weaker than boundedness is local boundedness. A family of bounded functions may be uniformly bounded. 

A bounded operator T : X → Y is not a bounded function in the sense of this page's definition (unless T = 0), but has the weaker property of preserving boundedness: Bounded sets M ⊆ X are mapped to bounded sets T(M) ⊆ Y. This definition can be extended to any function f : X → Y if X and Y allow for the concept of a bounded set. Boundedness can also be determined by looking at a graph.

Examples
 The sine function sin : R → R is bounded since  for all .
 The function , defined for all real x except for −1 and 1, is unbounded. As x approaches −1 or 1, the values of this function get larger in magnitude. This function can be made bounded if one restricts its domain to be, for example, [2, ∞) or (−∞, −2].
 The function , defined for all real x, is bounded, since  for all x.
 The inverse trigonometric function arctangent defined as: y =  or x =  is increasing for all real numbers x and bounded with − < y <  radians
 By the boundedness theorem, every continuous function on a closed interval, such as f : [0, 1] → R, is bounded. More generally, any continuous function from a compact space into a metric space is bounded.
All complex-valued functions f : C → C which are entire are either unbounded or constant as a consequence of Liouville's theorem. In particular, the complex sin : C → C must be unbounded since it is entire.
 The function f which takes the value 0 for x rational number and 1 for x irrational number (cf. Dirichlet function) is bounded. Thus, a function does not need to be "nice" in order to be bounded. The set of all bounded functions defined on [0, 1] is much larger than the set of continuous functions on that interval. (However, a continuous function must be bounded if its domain is both closed and bounded.)

See also
 Bounded set
 Compact support
Local boundedness
 Uniform boundedness

References 

Real analysis
Complex analysis
Types of functions